Liyi Dai is an electrical engineer from the United States Army Research Office in Durham, North Carolina. Dai was named a Fellow of the Institute of Electrical and Electronics Engineers (IEEE) in 2014 for his contributions to discrete event systems and singular systems.

References

20th-century births
Living people
Chinese electrical engineers
Fellow Members of the IEEE
21st-century American engineers
Year of birth missing (living people)
Place of birth missing (living people)